The 1987–88 Courage League National Division Three was the first full season of rugby union within the third tier of the English league system, currently known as the National League 1. Both Wakefield and West Hartlepool won ten matches, lost one and finished on twenty points. Wakefield finished as champions due to their superior points difference but neither team was promoted to National Division Two. Morley and Birmingham (without a win) finished in the bottom two places and both clubs were relegated to Area League North for the following season. Almost all clubs in the national divisions reported an increase in attendances.

Structure
Each team played one match against the other teams, playing a total of eleven matches each. There was no set date for matches, clubs having to arrange the fixtures amongst themselves.

Participating teams and locations

League table

Sponsorship
National Division Three is part of the Courage Clubs Championship and was sponsored by Courage Brewery

See also
 English Rugby Union Leagues
 English rugby union system
 Rugby union in England

References

External links
 National Clubs Association

N3
National League 1 seasons